Thayer Lake is a lake in Antrim County, Michigan, in the United States.

Thayer Lake was named for a family of early settlers.

See also
List of lakes in Michigan

References

Lakes of Michigan
Lakes of Antrim County, Michigan